The Ballons des Vosges Regional Nature Park (French: Parc naturel régional des Ballons des Vosges) is a protected area of woodland, pasture, wetland, farmland and historical sites in the regions of Grand Est and Bourgogne-Franche-Comté in northeastern France. The area was officially designated as a regional natural park in 1989.
187 communes belonging to the departments of Haut-Rhin, Vosges, Haute-Saône and Territoire de Belfort are members of the park, which hosts 238,000 inhabitants. It is one of the largest and most populated French regional parks. A wide range of habitats available in the park benefit a variety of wildlife such as boreal owl, lynx, peregrine falcon, western capercaillie, Dianthus superbus, cranberry and Drosera.

Image gallery 
Landscapes

Culture

See also
 List of regional natural parks of France

References

External links

 park website 

Regional natural parks of France
Geography of Haut-Rhin
Geography of Vosges (department)
Geography of Haute-Saône
Geography of the Territoire de Belfort
Protected areas established in 1989
Tourist attractions in Grand Est
Tourist attractions in Bourgogne-Franche-Comté
Vosges